Ancilla ventricosa is a species of sea snail, a marine gastropod mollusk in the family Ancillariidae, the olives and the like.

Subspecies
 Ancilla ventricosa fulva (Swainson, 1825)
 Ancilla ventricosa ventricosa (Lamarck, 1811)

Description

The length of the shell varies between 15 mm and 38 mm.

Distribution
This species occurs in the Red Sea and in the Indian Ocean off Mozambique.

References

External links
 Kantor Yu.I., Fedosov A.E., Puillandre N. & Bouchet P. (2016). Integrative taxonomy approach to Indo-Pacific Olividae: new species revealed by molecular and morphological data. Ruthenica. 26(2): 123–143
 

ventricosa
Gastropods described in 1811